Chahriq-e Sofla (also Romanized as Chahrīq-e Soflá; also known as Chahrīq-e Pā'īn) is a village in Chahriq Rural District, Kuhsar District, Salmas County, West Azerbaijan Province, Iran. At the 2006 census, its population was 310, in 54 families.

References 

Populated places in Salmas County